Laboratory Historic District is a national historic district located at Laboratory, Lincoln County, North Carolina. It encompasses seven contributing buildings and two contributing structures associated with the Laboratory Cotton Mill and its founder and owner, Daniel E. Rhyne.  They include the Laboratory Cotton Mill (1887), the Laboratory Cotton Mill Reservoir (c. 1887), the Daniel E. Rhyne House (1894), and the Federal / Greek Revival style Hoke-Rhyne House (c. 1844). The mill closed in the late 1990s.

It was listed on the National Register of Historic Places in 2003.

References

Historic districts on the National Register of Historic Places in North Carolina
Greek Revival houses in North Carolina
Federal architecture in North Carolina
Industrial buildings completed in 1887
Buildings and structures in Lincoln County, North Carolina
National Register of Historic Places in Lincoln County, North Carolina